Calcium hydrosulfide is the chemical compound with the formula  or  . It is formed from the reaction of calcium hydroxide or calcium carbonate with hydrogen sulfide:

Ca(OH)2 + 2H2S → Ca(HS)2 + 2H2O

CaCO3 + 2H2S → Ca(HS)2+H2O+CO2

References

Calcium compounds
Hydrosulfides